The Jersey RESTful Web Services, formerly Glassfish Jersey, currently Eclipse Jersey, framework is an open source framework for developing RESTful Web Services in Java. It provides support for JAX-RS APIs and serves as a JAX-RS (JSR 311 & JSR 339 & JSR 370) Reference Implementation.

Overview
The following components are part of Jersey:

 Core Server: For building RESTful services based on annotation (jersey-core, jersey-server, jsr311-api)
 Core Client: Aids you in communicating with REST services (jersey-client)
 JAXB support
 JSON support
 Integration module for Spring and Guice

References

External links
 

Java enterprise platform